The Gillette Mustangs (formerly Wyoming Mustangs) is a professional indoor football team based in Gillette, Wyoming. The team was announced as a 2021 expansion team as a member of Champions Indoor Football (CIF). The Mustangs play their home games at Wyoming Center at the CAM-PLEX. The team is owned by a local Gillette attorney, Steven Titus. The team had its first playoff birth in its second season eventually losing to the Billings Outlaws.

In 2022, Gillette lawyer Steven Titus purchased the team from Russ.

It was announced in late 2022, that Titus would rename the team to the Gillette Mustangs to shift the focus of the team's name from the state of Wyoming to the City of Gillette.

Season-by-season results

References

External links
 Official website

 
Sports leagues established in 2015
2015 establishments in the United States
Professional sports leagues in the United States
American football teams in Wyoming